Nida Rashid Dar (born 2 January 1987) is a Pakistani cricketer who plays as a right-handed batter and right-arm off break bowler. She is the first Pakistani cricketer to take 100 wickets in T20Is. She has played domestic cricket for Pakistan Universities, Zarai Taraqiati Bank Limited, Sialkot and Sydney Thunder.

Career
Dar made her One Day International debut against Ireland on 6 October 2010 in Potchefstroom, South Africa.

She made her Women's Twenty20 International (WT20I) debut on 6 May 2010 against Sri Lanka at Basseterre, St. Kitts. She was selected to play in the 2010 Asian Games in China.

On 6 June 2018, during the 2018 Women's Twenty20 Asia Cup match against Sri Lanka, she took her first five-wicket haul and the best bowling figures by a Pakistan woman in WT20Is. She finished the tournament as the highest wicket-taker for Pakistan, with eleven dismissals in five matches.

In October 2018, she was named in Pakistan's squad for the 2018 ICC Women's World Twenty20 tournament in the West Indies. Following the conclusion of the tournament, she was named as the standout player in the team by the International Cricket Council (ICC). In January 2020, she was named in Pakistan's squad for the 2020 ICC Women's T20 World Cup in Australia. In Pakistan's match against England, she played in her 100th WT20I match.

In June 2021, Dar was named in the Pakistan's squad across all formats for their away series against the West Indies. In the opening match of the T20I series, she picked up her 100th wicket by dismissing Deandra Dottin in the 10th over of the first innings, and became the first bowler, male or female to take 100 wickets in T20I cricket for Pakistan. Following the match, the Pakistan Cricket Board (PCB) congratulated her for achieving the feat.

In October 2021, she was named in Pakistan's team for the 2021 Women's Cricket World Cup Qualifier tournament in Zimbabwe. In January 2022, she was named as the vice-captain of Pakistan's team for the 2022 Women's Cricket World Cup in New Zealand. In May 2022, she was named in Pakistan's team for the cricket tournament at the 2022 Commonwealth Games in Birmingham, England.

Personal life
Dar's nickname, "Lady Boom Boom", is an allusion to her batting firepower. Her father Rashid Hassan was a first-class cricketer.

Awards
 PCB's Women’s Cricketer of the Year: 2021

References

External links
 
 

1987 births
Living people
People from Gujranwala
Pakistani people of Kashmiri descent
Pakistani women cricketers
Pakistan women One Day International cricketers
Pakistan women Twenty20 International cricketers
Pakistan Universities women cricketers
Zarai Taraqiati Bank Limited women cricketers
Sialkot women cricketers
Sydney Thunder (WBBL) cricketers
Asian Games gold medalists for Pakistan
Asian Games medalists in cricket
Cricketers at the 2010 Asian Games
Cricketers at the 2014 Asian Games
Medalists at the 2010 Asian Games
Medalists at the 2014 Asian Games
Cricketers at the 2022 Commonwealth Games
Commonwealth Games competitors for Pakistan